In mathematics, there are several equivalent ways of defining the real numbers. One of them is that they form a complete ordered field that does not contain any smaller complete ordered field. Such a definition does not prove that such a complete ordered field exists, and the existence proof consists of constructing a mathematical structure that satisfies the definition.

The article presents several such constructions. They are equivalent in the sense that, given the result of any two such constructions, there is a unique isomorphism of ordered field between them. This results from the above definition and is independent of particular constructions. These isomorphisms allow identifying the results of the constructions, and, in practice, to forget which construction has been chosen.

Axiomatic definitions
An axiomatic definition of the real numbers consists of defining them as the elements of  a complete ordered field. This means the following.

The existence of such a structure is a theorem, which is proved by constructing such a structure. A consequence of the axioms is that this structure is unique up to an isomorphism, and thus, the real numbers can be used and manipulated, without referring to the method of construction.

Axioms 
  is a field under addition and multiplication. In other words,
(associativity of addition and multiplication)
(commutativity of addition and multiplication)
(distributivity of multiplication over addition)
(existence of additive identity)
(existence of multiplicative identity)
(existence of additive inverses)
(existence of multiplicative inverses)
In other words,
(reflexivity)
(antisymmetry)
(transitivity)
(totality)
 Addition and multiplication are compatible with the order. In other words,
(preservation of order under addition)
 The order ≤ is complete in the following sense: every non-empty subset of  that is bounded above has a least upper bound. In other words,

On the least upper bound property 
Axiom 4, which requires the order to be Dedekind-complete, implies the Archimedean property.

The axiom is crucial in the characterization of the reals. For example, the totally ordered field of the rational numbers Q satisfy the first three axioms, but not the fourth. In other words, models of the rational numbers are also models of the first three axioms.

Note that the axiom is not firstorderizable, as it expresses a statement about collections of reals and not just individual such numbers. As such, the reals are not given by a first-order logic theory.

On models 

A model of real numbers is a mathematical structure that satisfies the above axioms.
Several models are given below. Any two models are isomorphic; so, the real numbers are unique up to isomorphisms.

Saying that any two models are isomorphic means that for any two models  and  there is a bijection  that preserves both the field operations and the order. Explicitly,
 is both injective and surjective.

Tarski's axiomatization of the reals

An alternative synthetic axiomatization of the real numbers and their arithmetic was given by Alfred Tarski, consisting of only the 8 axioms shown below and a mere four primitive notions: a set called the real numbers, denoted , a binary relation over  called order, denoted by infix <, a binary operation over  called addition, denoted by infix +, and the constant 1.

Axioms of order (primitives: , <):

Axiom 1. If x < y, then not y < x. That is, "<" is an asymmetric relation.

Axiom 2. If x < z, there exists a y such that x < y and y < z.

Axiom 3. "<" is Dedekind-complete. More formally, for all X, Y ⊆ , if for all x ∈ X and y ∈ Y, x < y, then there exists a z such that for all x ∈ X and y ∈ Y, if z ≠ x and z ≠ y, then x < z and z < y.

To clarify the above statement somewhat, let X ⊆  and Y ⊆ . We now define two common English verbs in a particular way that suits our purpose:

X precedes Y if and only if for every x ∈ X and every y ∈ Y, x < y.

The real number z separates X and Y if and only if for every x ∈ X with x ≠ z and every y ∈ Y with y ≠ z, x < z and z < y.

Axiom 3 can then be stated as:

"If a set of reals precedes another set of reals, then there exists at least one real number separating the two sets."

Axioms of addition (primitives: , <, +):

Axiom 4. x + (y + z) = (x + z) + y.

Axiom 5. For all x, y, there exists a z such that x + z = y.

Axiom 6. If x + y < z + w, then x < z or y < w.

Axioms for one (primitives: , <, +, 1):

Axiom 7. 1 ∈ .

Axiom 8. 1 < 1 + 1.

These axioms imply that  is a linearly ordered abelian group under addition with distinguished element 1.  is also Dedekind-complete and divisible.

Explicit constructions of models
We shall not prove that any models of the axioms are isomorphic. Such a proof can be found in any number of modern analysis or set theory textbooks. We will sketch the basic definitions and properties of a number of constructions, however, because each of these is important for both mathematical and historical reasons. The first three, due to Georg Cantor/Charles Méray, Richard Dedekind/Joseph Bertrand and Karl Weierstrass all occurred within a few years of each other. Each has advantages and disadvantages. A major motivation in all three cases was the instruction of mathematics students.

Construction from Cauchy sequences
A standard procedure to force all Cauchy sequences in a metric space to converge is adding new points to the metric space in a process called completion.

 is defined as the completion of Q with respect to the metric |x-y|, as will be detailed below (for completions of Q with respect to other metrics, see p-adic numbers.)

Let R be the set of Cauchy sequences of rational numbers. That is, sequences
 x1, x2, x3,... 
of rational numbers such that for every rational , there exists an integer N such that for all natural numbers , . Here the vertical bars denote the absolute value.

Cauchy sequences (xn) and (yn) can be added and multiplied as follows:
 (xn) + (yn) = (xn + yn)
 (xn) × (yn) = (xn × yn).

Two Cauchy sequences are called equivalent if and only if the difference between them tends to zero.
This defines an equivalence relation that is compatible with the operations defined above, and the set R of all equivalence classes can be shown to satisfy all axioms of the real numbers. We can embed Q into R by identifying the rational number r with the equivalence class of the sequence .

Comparison between real numbers is obtained by defining the following comparison between Cauchy sequences:  if and only if   
x is equivalent to y or there exists an integer N such that  for all    
.

By construction, every real number x is represented by a Cauchy sequence of rational numbers. This representation is far from unique; every rational sequence that converges to x is a representation of x. This reflects the observation that one can often use different sequences to approximate the same real number.

The only real number axiom that does not follow easily from the definitions is the completeness of ≤, i.e. the least upper bound property. It can be proved as follows: Let S be a non-empty subset of R and U be an upper bound for S. Substituting a larger value if necessary, we may assume U is rational. Since S is non-empty, we can choose a rational number L such that  for some s in S. Now define sequences of rationals (un) and (ln) as follows:

Set u0 = U and l0 = L.

For each n consider the number:

mn = (un + ln)/2

If mn is an upper bound for S set:

 un+1 = mn and ln+1 = ln

Otherwise set:

 ln+1 = mn and un+1 = un

It is easy to prove, by induction on n that:

 un is an upper bound for S for all n

and:

 ln is never an upper bound for S for any n

Thus u is an upper bound for S. To see that it is a least upper bound, notice that the limit of (un − ln) is 0, and so l = u. Now suppose  is a smaller upper bound for S. Since (ln) is monotonic increasing it is easy to see that  for some n. But ln is not an upper bound for S and so neither is b. Hence u is a least upper bound for S and ≤ is complete.

The usual decimal notation can be translated to Cauchy sequences in a natural way. For example, the notation π = 3.1415... means that π is the equivalence class of the Cauchy sequence (3,  3.1,  3.14,  3.141,  3.1415, ...). The equation 0.999... = 1 states that the sequences (0,  0.9,  0.99,  0.999,...) and (1, 1, 1, 1,...) are equivalent, i.e., their difference converges to 0.

An advantage of constructing R as the completion of Q is that this construction is not specific to one example; it is used for other metric spaces as well.

Construction by Dedekind cuts

A Dedekind cut in an ordered field is a partition of it, (A, B), such that A is nonempty and closed downwards, B is nonempty and closed upwards, and A contains no greatest element. Real numbers can be constructed as Dedekind cuts of rational numbers.

For convenience we may take the lower set  as the representative of any given Dedekind cut , since  completely determines .  By doing this we may think intuitively of a real number as being represented by the set of all smaller rational numbers.  In more detail, a real number  is any subset of the set  of rational numbers that fulfills the following conditions:
  is not empty
 
  is closed downwards.  In other words,  for all  such that , if  then 
  contains no greatest element.  In other words, there is no  such that for all , 

 We embed the rational numbers into the reals by identifying the rational number  with the set of all smaller rational numbers . Since the rational numbers are dense, such a set can have no greatest element and thus fulfills the conditions for being a real number laid out above.
 Addition. 
 Negation is a special case of subtraction: 
 Defining multiplication is less straightforward.
 if  then 
 We define division in a similar manner:
 if  then 
 Supremum.

As an example of a Dedekind cut representing an irrational number, we may take the positive square root of 2. This can be defined by the set . It can be seen from the definitions above that  is a real number, and that . However, neither claim is immediate.

An advantage of this construction is that each real number corresponds to a unique cut.

Construction using hyperreal numbers
As in the hyperreal numbers, one constructs the hyperrationals *Q from the rational numbers by means of an ultrafilter.  Here a hyperrational is by definition a ratio of two hyperintegers.  Consider the ring B of all limited (i.e. finite) elements in *Q.  Then B has a unique maximal ideal I, the infinitesimal numbers.  The quotient ring B/I gives the field R of real numbers .  Note that B is not an internal set in *Q.
Note that this construction uses a non-principal ultrafilter over the set of natural numbers, the existence of which is guaranteed by the axiom of choice.

It turns out that the maximal ideal respects the order on *Q.  Hence the resulting field is an ordered field.  Completeness can be proved in a similar way to the construction from the Cauchy sequences.

Construction from surreal numbers
Every ordered field can be embedded in the surreal numbers. The real numbers form a maximal subfield that is Archimedean (meaning that no real number is infinitely large or infinitely small).  This embedding is not unique, though it can be chosen in a canonical way.

Construction from integers (Eudoxus reals)
A relatively less known construction allows to define real numbers using only the additive group of integers  with different versions. The construction has been formally verified by the IsarMathLib project.  and  refer to this construction as the Eudoxus reals, named after an ancient Greek astronomer and mathematician Eudoxus of Cnidus.

Let an almost homomorphism be a map  such that the set  is finite. (Note that  is an almost homomorphism for every .) Almost homomorphisms form an abelian group under pointwise addition. We say that two almost homomorphisms  are almost equal if the set  is finite. This defines an equivalence relation on the set of almost homomorphisms. Real numbers are defined as the equivalence classes of this relation. Alternatively, the almost homomorphisms taking only finitely many values form a subgroup, and the underlying additive group of the real number is the quotient group. To add real numbers defined this way we add the almost homomorphisms that represent them. Multiplication of real numbers corresponds to functional composition of almost homomorphisms. This defines the linear order relation on the set of real numbers constructed this way.

Other constructions 
 write: "Few mathematical structures have undergone as many revisions or have been presented in as many guises as the real numbers. Every generation reexamines the reals in the light of its values and mathematical objectives."

A number of other constructions have been given, by:
 , 
 
 , 

For an overview, see .

As a reviewer of one noted: "The details are all included, but as usual they are tedious and not too instructive."

See also

References

Bibliography

 

 

  also at http://alexandria.tue.nl/repository/freearticles/597556.pdf

 

 

 

 

 

 

 

 

 

 

 

 

Real numbers
Constructivism (mathematics)